The 1945 WANFL season was the 61st season of the various incarnations of the Western Australian National Football League.

During the 1944 season, participation had been restricted to players under nineteen as of October 1, 1944. After the season, it was clear to the WANFL that changes had to be made to this underage restriction, since the Over-Age Footballers Association, the Metal Trades Association and services competitions were developing a good standard from players who were too old to play league football. In October 1944, the WANFL agreed to raise the limit to 25 years of age as of December 31, 1945, but this move proved ill-received and on March 29 the League decided to abolish age restrictions altogether, returning the WANFL to open-age competition. There was concern that the erratic availability of players who were still in the services would cause difficulties, which meant that the seconds competition, which was disbanded after 1940, was not resumed.

Numerous famous players of the era – amongst them Merv McIntosh and Bernie Naylor – remained entirely unavailable due to war service, and all clubs had to make constant changes to their lineups. It was generally thought that the 1945 teams would largely be composed of under-age players from 1944, but this proved not to be the case as most either joined the military or proved uncompetitive in senior competition. East Perth, whose unbeaten under-age team of 1944 retained many more of its players than any other club, found the going very tough in open competition and fell to sixth. Owing to the return of numerous top players from its 1941 team, including “Scranno” Jenkins, “Corp” Reilly, Alby Higham and Harry Carbon, South Fremantle, whose restricted-age team had at the close of 1944 lost 24 consecutive matches by an average of ninety-six points, recovered in remarkable fashion to reach the Grand Final.

Claremont was forced to play home games at Subiaco and the W.A.C.A. due to the 1944 Claremont Oval fire and the fact that the Claremont Showground, which would ordinarily have become an alternative Tiger home venue, were themselves burned in a fire in January 1945, finishing last by six games. East Fremantle and West Perth, who contested the previous open-age Grand Final, against set the pace, but Old Easts dominated the latter part of the season and won the premiership.

A new innovation was the Simpson Medal, the first award in Australian sport for the best player in a Grand Final.

Home-and-away season

Round 1

Round 2

Round 3

Round 4

Round 5

Round 6

Round 7

Round 8

Round 9

Round 10

Round 11

Round 12

Round 13

Round 14

Round 15

Round 16

Round 17

Round 18

Round 19

Round 20

Ladder

Finals

First semi-final

Second semi-final

Preliminary final

Grand Final

References

External links
Official WAFL website
Western Australian National Football League (WANFL), 1945

West Australian Football League seasons
WANFL